Constantin de Grimm (December 30, 1845 – April 19, 1896) also known as Baron de Grimm, was a Russian illustrator known internationally for his caricatures in publications such as the Vanity Fair (UK; under the pseudonym "Nemo"), Kladderadatsch (Germany), The Evening Telegram (US), and the German edition of Puck, of which he was founder. He served multiple times as president of the German Press Club. He served in the German Army from 1867 to 1873 and received the Iron Cross for bravery during the Franco-Prussian War. He then returned to cartooning, becoming assistant editor of Kladderadatsch in 1873, founding the German edition of Puck in 1874, and–after a year of art instruction at École des Beaux-Arts in Paris–became a journalist and drama critic. He went to the United States in 1884 after attracting the notice of James Gordon Bennett, publisher of the New York Herald, and became known to American readers through art in the Herald and Evening Telegram. He died in New York City in 1896 at the age of 50.

Select illustrations

References

External links

 

1845 births
1896 deaths
Russian emigrants to Germany
Artists from Leipzig
Vanity Fair (British magazine) artists
Recipients of the Iron Cross
German cartoonists